Dipicolylamine is an organic compound with the formula HN(CH2C5H4N)2.  It is a yellow liquid that is soluble in polar organic solvents.  The molecule is a secondary amine with two picolyl substituents.  The compound is a common tridentate ligand in coordination chemistry.

The compound can be prepared by many methods, alkylation of picolinylamine with picolinyl chloride, deamination of picolinylamine, and reductive amination of picolinyl amine and pyridine-2-carboxaldehyde. It is commonly used to bind to bacteria in purifying mixtures that require separation.

Related compounds
 Tris(2-pyridylmethyl)amine

References

Amines
2-Pyridyl compounds